Moscovian may refer to:

An inhabitant of Moscow, the capital of Russia
Something of, from, or related to Moscow
Moscovian (Carboniferous), a stage of the Carboniferous in the ICS geologic timescale